Schalk Verhoef (5 August 1935 – 18 January 1997) was a Dutch cyclist who won a bronze medal in the road race at the 1957 UCI Road World Championships. He was Dutch champion in 1955. He also won the Ronde van Zeeland in 1957 and individual stages of the Olympia's Tour (1956, 1957) and Ronde van Nederland (1960).

References

1935 births
1997 deaths
Dutch male cyclists
Cyclists from Rotterdam
UCI Road World Championships cyclists for the Netherlands